Pygochelidon is a genus of birds in the swallow family Hirundinidae that occur in the  Neotropics.

Taxonomy
The genus Pygochelidon was introduced in 1865 by the American naturalist Spencer Fullerton Baird with the blue-and-white swallow as the type species. The name combines the Ancient Greek  pugē meaning "rump" with khelidōn meaning "swallow".

This genus was formerly treated as a junior synonym of the genus Notiochelidon. It was resurrected to contain a clade of two species based on a genetic study published in 2005.

Species
The genus contains two species:
Blue-and-white swallow (Pygochelidon cyanoleuca)
Black-collared swallow (Pygochelidon melanoleuca)

References

 
Bird genera
Hirundinidae
Taxonomy articles created by Polbot